The Journal of Cultural Heritage is a bimonthly peer-reviewed academic journal covering all aspects of cultural heritage. It was established in 2000 and is published by Elsevier. The editor-in-chief is Patrizia Tomasin (Istituto di Chimica Inorganica e delle Superfici, Consiglio Nazionale delle Ricerche). According to the Journal Citation Reports, the journal has a 2020 impact factor of 2.955, ranking it 1st out of 83 in Art.

References

External links 
 
 

Bimonthly journals
Cultural journals
Elsevier academic journals
English-language journals
Publications established in 2000